Jeff Davis County Courthouse in Hazlehurst, Georgia was constructed in 1906.  W. Chamberlain & Co. designed the building. Renovations were completed in 1975 and 1995. The latest renovations were designed by Brittain, Thompson, Bray, Brown, Inc.  

Designed in the Neoclassical Revival style, the building is the county's first courthouse. A domed clock tower rises above the structure.  The dome is "rather Eastern in feeling".  Windows of the dome were enclosed in renovations before 1980.  The footprint of the building is unusual: it has octagonal pavilions at each corner of a rectangular design.

It was listed on the National Register of Historic Places in 1980.

References

External links
 

Courthouses on the National Register of Historic Places in Georgia (U.S. state)
Neoclassical architecture in Georgia (U.S. state)
Government buildings completed in 1906
Buildings and structures in Jeff Davis County, Georgia
County courthouses in Georgia (U.S. state)
National Register of Historic Places in Jeff Davis County, Georgia
1906 establishments in Georgia (U.S. state)